Anorexia Nervosa is a French symphonic black metal band from Limoges, formed in 1991. They are currently "on hold" due to the departure of vocalist RMS Hreidmarr.

Biography
Anorexia Nervosa (full name Anorexia Nervosa the Nihilistic Orchestra) was formed in 1991 as Necromancia, with a line-up consisting of Stéphane Bayle (guitar), Marc Zabé (guitar), Pierre Couquet (bass), Nilcas Vant (drums) and Stéphane Gerbaud (vocals). As Necromancia they produced a demo in 1993, The Garden of Delight. A second demo, Nihil Negativum, gave Anorexia Nervosa its place in the underground metal scene. The demo featured the dark, industrial atmosphere that their album Exile was later known for. During a concert in the south of France, Michael Berberian, from Season of Mist Records, noticed the band and offered them a contract for an album. Exile, was released in 1997. Reminiscent of their previous work, Nihil Negativum, Exile had a dark industrial sound to it. Not only was the album unique in the history of the band, but in the broader black metal genre itself. Twenty-four hundred copies of the album were sold, allowing access to a larger audience and onto a series of concerts with Cradle of Filth, Absu, Misanthrope, amongst others.

They left the label after the release of Exile, and replaced Gerbaud and Zabé with new singer RMS Hreidmarr and keyboardist Neb Xort. They then pursued a new, self-described "dark nihilistic metal" direction featuring a very fast, hysterical and powerfully orchestrated sound, with second album Sodomizing the Archangel, recorded at the band's own Drudenhaus Studio and released by Osmose Productions in 1999. They followed this with the Drudenhaus album, which was released in March 2000, and proved to be a huge success for the band.

Further evolving the style was their 2001 release, New Obscurantis Order, which involved even faster tempos, more polished orchestrations and an all-around more violent sound. They toured all over Europe with the likes of Cradle of Filth, and Rotting Christ, by now an established symphonic black metal band. Anorexia Nervosa then went on hiatus for three years, returning with a new album, Redemption Process in 2004, now on Listenable Records.

Approximately one year later, the band released The September E.P. which features a director's cut of Sister September, three cover tracks, and four live tracks. The EP was released to be a "goodie" from the band until they are ready to record their next studio album.

On 20 December 2005 vocalist Rose Hreidmarr quit the band. His statement on the matter reads as follows:

"Leaving Anorexia Nervosa was definitely not the easiest thing to do as we've shared so much during our time together as this band had become a vivid part of my daily life. For seven years, the band has been giving me so many opportunities on a musical and human level and has heavily contributed to become the person I'm today. Still, I honestly thought I had reached the end of a personal era with the album 'Redemption Process' and I now feel the need to take a different path. I'm also absolutely proud of what I have been able to achieve with the rest of the band members who will always remain my best friends and I wish them the very best for the future."

Soon afterwards, the remaining band members held auditions for a new singer, but failure to find a replacement has caused guitarist Stéphane Bayle to put the band in "stand-by" mode, fearing the group may become "some sort of parody" of itself.  A decade following the start of their hiatus, their future still remains unclear.

Since his departure from Anorexia Nervosa, Rose Hreidmarr has been singer for The Cosa Nostra Klub, a black/industrial metal band.

Stéphane Bayle and Neb Xort also participated in Jensara Swann and Ben Notox's band The Veil, both on their first album Sleeping Among Serpents, released in 2006 and as session musicians for their first concerts. Neb Xort is still involved with the band as producer, and engineered The Veil's second album Vestige in 2008, and Ad Inferna's Trance N Dance in 2009. Bayle produced The Cosa Nostra Klub's second album, L'Hymne la Joie, in 2007.

Musical Style

In the band's early days as Necromanacia, the band played death metal, exemplified on their demo The Garden of Delight; but began to incorporate elements of industrial metal in their sound, which laid the basis for the dissonant and experimental sound on their debut album, Exile, which often switched between fast tempos and thrashing guitars back to a slow, ambient style, complemented with a grim vocal delivery. Nonetheless, with the departure of original vocalist Stéphane Gerbaud and the entry of R.M.S. Hreidmarr, the band went through a seismic genre shift, abandoning their early industrial death metal sound for a symphonic black metal sound, comparable to Cradle of Filth, which is considered the band's signature sound.

The band's debut, Exile, a concept album, based itself on themes of neurosis and experimentation on madness. Violence and depression would largely feature as the main source of the band's lyricism. However, Redemption Process is a concept album that focuses on lyrics about finding redemption.

Band members

Final Members
 Stéphane Bayle: guitar (1995–2005)
 Nilcas Vant: drums (1995–2005)
 Pier Couquet: bass (1995–2005)
 Neb Xort: keyboards (1998–2005)

Former members
 Marc Zabé: guitar, keyboards (1995–1998)
 Stéphane Gerbaud: vocals (1995–1998)
 Nicolas "R.M.S." Saint-Morand: vocals (1998–2005)

Timeline

Discography

Studio albums
 Exile (1997)
 Drudenhaus (2000)
 New Obscurantis Order (2001)
 Redemption Process (2004)

EPs
 Sodomizing the Archedangel (1999)
 The September E.P. (2005)

Demos
 The Garden of Delight (1993)
 Nihil Negativum (1995)

Compilation albums
 Suicide Is Sexy (2004)

Bootleg albums
 Disturbed (2009)

References

French industrial metal musical groups
French black metal musical groups
Symphonic black metal musical groups
Musical groups established in 1995
Musical groups disestablished in 2005
Musical quartets
Season of Mist artists
Musical groups from Nouvelle-Aquitaine
Listenable Records artists